Dantas is a Portuguese language surname. It may refer to:

Alexandre Dantas (born 1979), Brazilian mixed martial arts fighter
Allan Dellon dos Santos Dantas (born 1979), Brazilian football player
Beatriz Góis Dantas (born 1941), Brazilian anthropologist
Damiris Dantas (born 1992), Brazilian basketball player 
Daniel Dantas (actor) (born 1954), Brazilian actor
Daniel Dantas (entrepreneur) (born 1954), Brazilian banker
Eduardo Dantas (born 1989), Brazilian mixed martial artist
Gustavo Dantas (born 1974), Brazilian martial artist
Isidore Dantas (born 1947), Indian writer
Ivonete Dantas (born 1959), Brazilian politician
Júlio Dantas (1876–1962), Portuguese writer
João Rodrigues Dantas, Portuguese nobleman
Leandro Teixeira Dantas (born 1987), Brazilian football player
Lucas Marcolini Dantas Bertucci (born 1989), Brazilian football player
Luiz Martins de Souza Dantas (1876–1954), Brazilian diplomat
Marcello Dantas (born 1967), Brazilian artist
Maria Dantas (born 1969), Spanish politician
Nelson Dantas (1928–2006), Brazilian actor
Pedro Iarley Lima Dantas (born 1974), Brazilian football player
Rodrigo Correa Dantas (born 1989), Brazilian football player
Rubem Dantas (born 1954), Brazilian musician
San Tiago Dantas (1911–1964), Brazilian diplomat and Minister of Foreign Affairs
Welington Dantas de Jesus (born 1982), Brazilian football player

See also
Francisco Dantas, municipality in the state of Rio Grande do Norte, Brazil
Poço Dantas, a municipality in the state of Paraíba, Brazil
Riachão do Dantas, municipality in the state of Sergipe, Brazil

Portuguese-language surnames